Duke You of Lu (died 974 BC or 975 BC), personal name Ji Zai or Yi, was the fourth ruler of the state of Lu, reigning for a total of 14 years. He inherited the duchy from his father, Duke Yang.

According to Records of the Grand Historian, he was murdered by his younger brother Ji Fei (Duke Wei) who then took over the duchy.

References

Monarchs of Lu (state)
Chinese dukes
10th-century BC Chinese monarchs
970s BC deaths